The John Reichert Farmhouse is a Stick style house built around 1885 and located in Mequon, Wisconsin, United States. It was added to the National Register of Historic Places in 1982.

John Reichert built this house around 1885 on his 80-acre farm. The house is two stories, with a cross-gable floor-plan. The east and north ends sport trompe-l'œil bay windows. Above them the gable peaks are decorated with elaborate woodwork.

References

Houses in Ozaukee County, Wisconsin
Houses completed in 1885
Houses on the National Register of Historic Places in Wisconsin
Stick-Eastlake architecture in the United States
National Register of Historic Places in Ozaukee County, Wisconsin